A    is a  concrete cube bearing a brass plate inscribed with the name and life dates of victims of Nazi extermination or persecution. Literally, it means 'stumbling stone' and metaphorically 'stumbling block'. (plural )

The  project, initiated by the German artist Gunter Demnig in 1992, aims to commemorate individuals at exactly the last place of residencyor, sometimes, workwhich was freely chosen by the person before they fell victim to Nazi terror, forced euthanasia, eugenics, deportation to a concentration or extermination camp, or escaped persecution by emigration or suicide. , 75,000  have been laid, making the  project the world's largest decentralized memorial.

The majority of  commemorate Jewish victims of the Holocaust. Others have been placed for Sinti and Romani people (then also called "gypsies"), Poles, homosexuals, the physically or mentally disabled, Jehovah's Witnesses, black people, members of the Communist Party, the Social Democratic Party, and the anti-Nazi Resistance, the Christian opposition (both Protestants and Catholics), and Freemasons, along with International Brigade soldiers in the Spanish Civil War, military deserters, conscientious objectors, escape helpers, capitulators, "habitual criminals", looters, and others charged with treason, military disobedience, or undermining the Nazi military, as well as Allied soldiers.

Origin of the name 
The name of the  project invokes multiple allusions. In Nazi Germany, an antisemitic saying, when accidentally stumbling over a protruding stone, was: "A Jew must be buried here". In a metaphorical sense, the German term  can mean "potential problem". The term "to stumble across something", in German and English, can also mean "to find out (by chance)". Thus, the term provocatively invokes an antisemitic remark of the past, but at the same time intends to provoke thoughts about a serious issue.  are not placed prominently, but are rather discovered by chance, only recognizable when passing by at close distance. In contrast to central memorial places, which according to Demnig can be easily avoided or bypassed,  represent a much deeper intrusion of memory into everyday life.

 are placed right into the pavement. When Jewish cemeteries were destroyed throughout Nazi Germany, the gravestones were often repurposed as sidewalk paving stones. The desecration of the memory of the dead was implicitly intended, as people had to walk on the gravestones and tread on the inscriptions. The  provocatively hint at this act of desecration, as they lack any kind of defense against new acts of shame. While the art project thus intends to keep alive the memory, implying that improper acts could easily happen again, the intentional lack of defense against potential desecration also created criticism and concern.

"Here lived..." 

Research about future  locations is usually done by local school children and their teachers, victims' relatives, or local history organizations. The database of Yad Vashem in Jerusalem and the online database of the Mapping the Lives publication of the 1939 Germany Minority Census are used to search for names and residential addresses of Nazi victims.

When research on a particular person is completed, Demnig sets out to manufacture an individual . The person's name and dates of birth, deportation and death, if known, are engraved into the brass plate. The words  ('Here lived...') are written on most of the plates, emphasizing that the victims of persecution did not live and work at any anonymous place, but "right here". The  is then inserted at flush level into the roadway or sidewalk, at the individual's last known place of freely chosen residence or work, with the intention to "trip up the passer-by" and draw attention to the memorial.

From the beginning of the project until 2012, one  cost €95. In 2012, the price increased to €120. Each individual  is still manufactured by hand, so that only about 440 of them can be produced per month. Today, it may take up to several months from the application for a new  until it is finally installed.

Starting in 2005, Michael Friedrichs-Friedländer has partnered with Gunter Demnig to install about 63,000  in 20 different languages. Friedrichs-Friedländer explained to a reporter that he has not changed the engraving process and all engraving continues to be completed by hand; this is purposeful, to prevent the process from becoming anonymous.

First Stolperstein 

On 16 December 1992, 50 years had passed since Heinrich Himmler had signed the so-called  ('Auschwitz decree'), ordering the deportation of Sinti and Roma to extermination camps. This order marks the beginning of the mass deportation of Jews from Germany. To commemorate this date, Gunter Demnig traced the "road to deportation" by pulling a self-built, rolling pavement-printing machine through the inner city to the train station, where the deportees had boarded the trains to the extermination camps. Afterward, he installed the first  in front of Cologne's historic City Hall. On its brass plate were engraved the first lines of the Auschwitz decree. Demnig also intended to contribute to the debate, ongoing at that time, about granting the right of residence in Germany to Roma people who had fled from former Yugoslavia.

Gradually, the idea arose of expanding the commemoration project to include all victims of Nazi persecution, as well as always doing so at the last places of residence which they were free to choose. A  would symbolically bring back the victims to their neighbourhoods, to the places where they rightfully belonged, even many years after they had been deported. Gunter Demnig published further details of his project in 1993, and outlined his artistic concept in a contribution to the project  ('Megalomania: Art Projects for Europe'). In 1994, he exhibited 250 Stolpersteine for murdered Sinti and Roma at St Anthony's Church in Cologne, encouraged by Kurt Pick, the parish priest. This church, located prominently in Cologne city centre, was already serving as an important commemorative institution, and is part of the Cross of Nails community since 2016. In January 1995, these  were brought to different locations in the city of Cologne, and laid into the pavements.

Another 55  were set up in the Kreuzberg neighborhood of Berlin in 1996, during the "Artists Research Auschwitz" project. In 1997, the first two  were laid in St. Georgen, Austria, commemorating Jehovah's Witnesses Matthias and Johann Nobis. This had been suggested by Andreas Maislinger, founder of Arts Initiative KNIE and the Austrian Holocaust Memorial Service. Friedrich Amerhauser was the first mayor who granted permission to install  within his city. Four years later, Demnig received permission to install 600 more  in Cologne.

A growing memorial 

By October 2007, Gunter Demnig had laid more than 13,000  in more than 280 cities. He expanded his project beyond the borders of Germany to Austria, Italy, the Netherlands and Hungary. Some  were scheduled to be laid in Poland on 1 September 2006, but permission was withdrawn, and the project was cancelled.

On 24 July 2009, the 20,000th  was unveiled in the Rotherbaum district of Hamburg, Germany. Gunter Demnig, representatives of the Hamburg government and its Jewish community, and descendants of the victims attended. By May 2010, more than 22,000  had been set in 530 European cities and towns, in eight countries which had formerly been under Nazi control or occupied by Nazi Germany.

By July 2010 the number of  had risen to more than 25,000, in 569 cities and smaller towns. By June 2011 Demnig had installed 30,000 .

In 2013 Gunter Demnig stated on his website:

During a talk at TEDxKoeln on 14 May 2013, Gunter Demnig announced the installation of the 40,000th , which had taken place in Oldambt (Drieborg), Netherlands, on 3 July 2013. It was one of the first 10  in memory of Dutch communists who were executed by the German occupation forces after their betrayal by countrymen for hiding Jews and Roma.

On 11 January 2015, the 50,000th  was installed in Torino, Italy, for Eleonora Levi.

On 23 October 2018, the 70,000th  was installed in Frankfurt, Germany, for Willy Zimmerer, a victim of Nazi euthanasia who was murdered at Hadamar on 18 December 1944, when he was 43 years old.

On 29 December 2019, the 75,000th  was installed in Memmingen (Bavaria) for Martha and Benno Rosenbaum.

Locations 

 are always installed in front of the last home which the victim had chosen freely. The most important source for potential locations is the so-called  ('Jews register'), which was set up at the 1939 census of Germany as of 17 May 1939. In cases where the actual houses were destroyed during World War II or during later restructuring of the cities, some  have been installed at the former site of the house.

By the end of 2016, Gunter Demnig and his co-workers had installed about 60,000 stones in more than 1,200 towns and cities throughout Europe:
 Germany (since 1992)
 Austria (since 1997)
 The Netherlands and Hungary (since 2007)
 Poland and Czech Republic (since 2008)
 Belgium and Ukraine (since 2009)
 Italy (since 2010)
 Norway (since 2011)
 Slovakia and Slovenia (since 2012)
 France, Croatia, Luxemburg, Russia and Switzerland (since 2013)
 Romania (since 2014)
 Greece and Spain (since 2015)
 Belarus (since 2014)
 Lithuania (since 2016).
 Finland (since 2018)
 Moldova (since 2018)
 Denmark and Sweden (since 2019)
 Serbia (since 2021)

Netherlands 
Since 2007, Demnig has frequently been invited to place  in the Netherlands. The first city to do so was Borne. As of 2016, 82  have been installed there. By January 2016, in total, more than 2,750  have been laid in 110 Dutch cities and townships, including Amsterdam, The Hague and Rotterdam, but particularly in smaller cities like Hilversum (92 ), Gouda (183), Eindhoven (244), Oss and Oudewater (263 each). In March 2016 Demnig was in the Netherlands again, placing stones in Hilversum, Monnickendam, and Gouda, and Amsterdam. In the latter city he placed 74 stones; 250 had already been placed, and there were requests for 150 more.

Czech Republic 
In the Czech Republic, the work on  started on 8 October 2008 in Prague and was initiated by the Czech Union of Jewish Students. Today,  are found across almost the entire area of the country. As of January 2016 the exact number of  has not yet been established, but the main work was done in the larger cities, including Prague, Brno, Olomouc and Ostrava. In the small cities of Tišnov there are 15, and in Lomnice u Tišnova nine . One of them commemorates Hana Brady, who was murdered at the age of 13.

Italy 

Work in Italy began in Rome on 28 January 2010; there are now 207  (in Italian called "pietre d'inciampo") there. In 2012, work continued in the regions of Liguria, Trentino-Alto Adige/Südtirol and Lombardia. Veneto and Tuscany joined in 2014, Emilia-Romagna in 2015, Apulia, Abruzzo and Friuli-Venezia Giulia in 2016, Marche in 2017. In Italy, marked differences are observed, as compared to other countries: many  are dedicated not only to Jewish people and members of the political resistance, but also to soldiers of the Italian army who were disarmed, deported to Germany, and had to work as forced laborers there. They were given special status, so that they were not protected as prisoners of war under the Geneva Conventions after Italy left the coalition of the Axis powers after 8 September 1943.

France 
In France where 75,000 Jews were deported to the concentration camps, initial efforts to install  were rejected. In fact,  contain no reference to the religion of the victim who is commemorated, and 'freedom of opinion/expression' has never been invoked in either French or European jurisprudence to justify the refusal to commemorate individual victims of war crimes. The Mayor of La Baule has consistently refused to elaborate on his reasoning, and there is no record of the Municipal Council of La Baule having sought a declaration from the Conseil d'Etat in respect of these objections.

The first  were installed in France in 2015 in L'Aiguillon-sur-Mer in the Vendée.

Other countries 

 have also been installed in Spain, Sweden, Switzerland and the United Kingdom, though these countries were never occupied.  in Switzerland mostly remember people who were caught smuggling illegal written material at the German border. In Spain, a large number of Republicans who fled to France after Francisco Franco's victory were caught by the Nazis after they had invaded France, and were either handed over to the Vichy regime, or deported to Mauthausen-Gusen concentration camp. About 7,000 Spanish people were held prisoner there, and were subjected to forced labour; more than half of them were murdered. The survivors were denationalized by the Franco regime, and became stateless persons, who were denied any form of recognition as victims, and deprived of any reparation. In Sweden, since 2019, the few  remember Jewish refugees who escaped there only to be captured by German spies and taken to the camps.

In Helsinki, Finland, there are seven  to honor Austrian Jewish refugees who had arrived to the country but who were given over to the Gestapo in November 1942. They were taken to Auschwitz and only one of the eight people survived.

In Dublin, Ireland, six  (unveiled in 2022) commemorate six Irish Jews who were murdered in the Holocaust: Ettie Steinberg, her Belgian-born husband Wojtech Gluck and their son Leon Gluck, who were all murdered at Auschwitz in 1942; Isaac Shishi, killed at Viekšniai, Lithuania in 1941; and siblings Ephraim and Jeanne (Lena) Saks, murdered at Auschwitz in 1944. Shishi and the Sakses were all born in Dublin but moved to continental Europe before war broke out.

In November 2022 the first  in the UK was installed in Golden Square, Soho, London, commemorating Ada von Dantzig, who was murdered at Auschwitz in 1943 after she returned to the Netherlands, to rescue her family, who also became victims.

Even in countries where no  are installed, such as the United States, the decentralized monument of the  has attracted media attention.

Stolperschwellen: "From here..." 

The text usually starts with the words: "" ('From here...').  are installed at Stralsund main station. From there, 1,160 mentally ill persons were deported in December 1939, victims of the forced euthanasia program Action T4, and murdered in Wielka Piaśnica.

Other  commemorate female forced labourers from Geißlingen, who were imprisoned in the Natzweiler-Struthof concentration camp, the victims of the Holocaust in Luxemburg in Ettelbrück, forced laborers in Glinde and Völklingen, victims of forced euthanasia in Merseburg, and the first deportees, Roma and Sinti from Cologne. Further  exist in Bad Buchau, Berlin-Friedenau, Nassau, another in Stralsund, and one in Weingarten. A  was set up in Thessaloniki in front of the house in which Alois Brunner and Adolf Eichmann had planned the deportation and annihilation of 96.5% of the Jewish population of the town.

Public discussion

Opposition 
The city of Villingen-Schwenningen heatedly debated the idea of allowing  in 2004, but voted against them. There is a memorial at the railway station and there are plans for a second memorial.

She objected to the idea that the names of murdered Jews be inserted in the pavement, where people might accidentally step on them. The vice president of the Central Council, Salomon Korn, however, warmly welcomed the idea at the same time. Christian Ude, then mayor of Munich, warned against an "inflation of monuments". Demnig also took part in the discussion, stating that "he intends to create a memorial at the very place where the deportation started: at the homes where people had lived last". The rejection was reconsidered and upheld in 2015; other ways of commemoration, like plaques on the walls of individual houses, and a central memorial displaying the names of the people deported from Munich, will be set up. The city's rejection of participation in the project only affects public property, however. As of 2020 around a hundred  have been installed on private property.

In other cities, permission for the project was preceded by long and sometimes emotional discussions. In Krefeld, the vice-chairman of the Jewish community, Michael Gilad, said that Demnig's memorials reminded him of how the Nazis had used Jewish gravestones as slabs for sidewalks. A compromise was reached that a  could be installed if a prospective site was approved by both the house's owner and (if applicable) the victim's relatives. The majority in the city council, CDU and FDP, opposed the project and prevented it. Starting in 2009, 23  for the Belgian city of Antwerp have been produced; however, owing to local resistance to the project, they have been unable to be installed. They have been stored in Brussels, where they are regularly exhibited.

The Polish Institute of National Remembrance (IPN) has expressed reservations towards the project, noting that the form of the memorial, particularly its location on regular sidewalks, which are regularly stomped over by passersby, is not respectful.

Support 
The majority of German cities welcome the installation of Stolpersteine. In Frankfurt am Main, which had a long tradition of Jewish life before the Holocaust, the 1000th  was set in May 2015, and newspapers publish progress reports and invitations for citizens to sponsor further memorial stones. In Frankfurt, the victim's descendants are not allowed to sponsor ; these have to be paid for by the current inhabitants of the house, ensuring that they will respect the monument.

Reactions of passers-by 
Their thoughts are directed towards the victims. Cambridge historian Joseph Pearson argues that "It is not what is written [on the stolpersteine] which intrigues, because the inscription is insufficient to conjure a person. It is the emptiness, void, lack of information, the maw of the forgotten, which gives the monuments their power and lifts them from the banality of a statistic."

Development of a commemorative tradition 

Often the installation of a new  is announced in local newspapers or on the cities' official websites and is accompanied by a remembrance gathering. Citizens, school children and relatives of the persons who are commemorated on the plates are invited to take part. Often the citizens state that they are motivated by the idea that "they were our neighbors", and that they wish to remember the victim's names, or, symbolically, allow the deported to return to the place where they rightfully belong. If the person remembered on the plate was Jewish, their descendants are invited to attend the installation of the stone, and pray Kaddish, if they wish to do so.

 are installed in places where they are exposed to all kinds of climatic conditions, dust and dirt. As the brass material of the plates is subject to superficial corrosion, it will become dull over time if it is not cleaned from time to time. Demnig recommends regular cleaning of the plates. Many regional initiatives have set up schedules for cleaning and acts of remembrance, when Stolpersteine are adorned with flowers or candles. Often remembrance days are chosen for these activities:
 27 January, International Holocaust Remembrance Day.
 Yom HaShoah, 27 Nisan (April-May
 12 June, birthday of Anne Frank
 9 November, the German  Remembrance Day

Documentary film 
A documentary, was made by Dörte Franke in 2008.

Gallery

Stolpersteine in different countries 
 Austria: Stolpersteine in the district of Braunau am Inn
 Belgium: Stolpersteine in Charleroi
 Czech Republic: Prague: Josefov, Malá Strana, Vršovice and Modřany – Královéhradecký kraj
 Germany: Lake Constance district, Weingarten
 Lithuania: Stumbling Stones in Lithuania
 Norway: Snublesteiner i Norge

See also 
 List of places with stolpersteine
 Shoes on the Danube Bank
 Culture of Remembrance
  ('Coming to terms with the past')
 Last Address

References

Sources 
 Kurt Walter & AG Spurensuche, Stolpersteine in Duisburg, Evangelischer Kirchenkreis Duisburg/ Evangelisches Familienbildungswerk, Duisburg (2005)  
 Beate Meyer (editor), Die Verfolgung und Ermordung der Hamburger Juden 1933–1945. Geschichte, Zeugnis, Erinnerung, Landeszentrale für Politische Bildung, Hamburg (2006) 
 Kirsten Serup-Bilfeldt, Stolpersteine. Vergessene Namen, verwehte Spuren. Wegweiser zu Kölner Schicksalen in der NS-Zeit, Kiepenheuer & Witsch (2003)  
 Oswald Burger and Hansjörg Straub, Die Levingers. Eine Familie in Überlingen, Eggingen (2002)  
 Stumbling Upon Memories (Photos)

External links 

 Gunter Demnig and the Stumbling Blocks
  Gunter Demnig's homepage
 (in English) Gunter Demnig's homepage
 antidef.org.au

Types of monuments and memorials
Holocaust commemoration
Upper Austria
Austrian art
The Holocaust in Italy
The Holocaust in the Netherlands
The Holocaust in Germany
The Holocaust in Austria
The Holocaust in Hungary
The Holocaust in Czechoslovakia
Jewish Czech history
 
Public art
Articles containing video clips